International Automobile League was a brass era American automobile company.

History 
Founded in Buffalo, New York, in summer 1908 with a capitalization of US$50,000, International's officers were A. C. Bidwell and C. H. Bowe.

In summer 1910, it was reorganized as the International Automobile League Tire and Rubber Company, capitalized at one million dollars, again by Bidwell and Bowe. Like many early American automobile companies, it is doubtful International actually built any cars.

Sources
Kimes, Beverly Rae. The Standard Catalog of American Cars, 1805-1942. Iola, Wisconsin: Krause Publications, 1989. .

Brass Era vehicles
1900s cars
Defunct motor vehicle manufacturers of the United States
Vehicle manufacturing companies established in 1908
Motor vehicle manufacturers based in New York (state)
History of Buffalo, New York
Defunct companies based in New York (state)
1908 establishments in New York (state)
Vehicle manufacturing companies disestablished in 1910
1910 disestablishments in New York (state)